Events from the year 1768 in art.

Events
 December 10 – Royal Academy founded in London, with Joshua Reynolds as its first President.
 Tilly Kettle becomes the first English painter to work in India.

Works

 Thomas Gainsborough 
Elizabeth and Thomas Linley (circa) 
Ignatius Sancho
 Sir Joshua Reynolds – Mrs Abington as the Comic Muse (approximate date)
 Alexander Roslin – The Lady with the Veil (The Artist's Wife)
 Jacques Saly – Frederik V on Horseback (bronze cast)
 Benjamin West – General Johnson Saving a Wounded French Officer from the Tomahawk of a North American Indian
 Joseph Wright of Derby – An Experiment on a Bird in the Air Pump

Births
 March 2 – Benjamin Duterrau, English painter, etcher, engraver, sculptor and art lecturer (died 1851)
 March 10 – Domingos Sequeira, Portuguese painter (died 1837)
 March 19 – François Joseph Bosio, French sculptor (died 1845)
 April 18 – Jean-Baptiste Debret, French painter of lithographs depicting the people of Brazil (died 1848)
 May 5 – Ezra Ames, American portrait painter (died 1836)
 June 29 – Vincenzo Dimech, Maltese sculptor (died 1831)
 July 10 – Hendrik Voogd, Dutch painter and printmaker, who was active in Italy (died 1839)
 July 27 – Joseph Anton Koch, Austrian painter of the German Romantic movement (died 1839)
 August 22 – Josef Abel, historical painter and etcher (died 1818)
 December 18 – Marie-Guillemine Benoist, French neoclassical, historical and genre painter (died 1826)
 December 22 – John Crome, English artist in the Romantic era (died 1821)
 date unknown
 Pierre Audouin, French engraver (died 1822)
 Juliane Wilhelmine Bause, German landscape etcher (died 1837)
 Andrey Yefimovich Martynov, Russian painter and engraver (died 1826)
 Charlotta Malm-Reuterholm, Finnish painter (died 1845)
 Vasily Rodchev, Russian history painter (died 1803)
 Peter Edward Stroehling, portrait artist from either Germany or the Russian Empire (died 1826)
 Elkanah Tisdale, American engraver, miniature painter and cartoonist (died 1835)

Deaths
 January 26 – Tibout Regters, Dutch portrait painter (born 1710)
 April 10 – Giovanni Antonio Canal, better known as Canaletto, Venetian artist famous for his landscapes, or vedute, of Venice (born 1697)
 April 14 – Francesco Monti, Italian fresco painter (born 1683)
 April 24 – Johann Valentin Tischbein, German theatre painter (born 1715)
 April 29 – Filippo della Valle, Italian sculptor (born 1698)
 June 11 – Stefano Pozzi, Italian painter, designer, draughtsman and decorator (died 1699/1707)
 August 18 – Giovanni Domenico Ferretti, Italian Rococo painter from Florence (born 1692)
 August 24 – Isaac Basire, English engraver and head of family of engravers (born 1704)
 November 5 – Giorgio Duranti, Italian painter of still lifes (born 1683)
 December 8 – Jean Denis Attiret, French Jesuit missionary and painter (born 1702)
 date unknown
 Johan Backman, Finnish painter (born 1706)
 Antonio Baldi, Italian painter and engraver (born 1692)
 Miguel Cabrera, indigenous Zapotec painter, (born 1695)
 Samuel Collins, British miniature painter (born 1735)
 Giovanni Domenico Campiglia, Italian painter and engraver from Florence (born 1692)
 Charles Cressent, French furniture-maker, sculptor and fondeur-ciseleur of the régence style (born 1685)

References

 
Years of the 18th century in art
1760s in art